Fiji competed at the 1976 Summer Paralympics in Toronto, Ontario, Canada. Fiji was making its return to the Paralympic Games, having been absent since 1964. The country was represented by eight athletes competing in two sports: athletics and swimming. Fiji's representatives did not win any medals.

See also
Fiji at the 1976 Summer Olympics

References

Nations at the 1976 Summer Paralympics
1976
Paralympics